The de Havilland Gipsy Six is a British six-cylinder, air-cooled, inverted inline piston engine developed by the de Havilland Engine Company for aircraft use in the 1930s. It was based on the cylinders of the four-cylinder Gipsy Major and went on to spawn a whole series of similar aero engines that were still in common use until the 1980s.

The engines were of particular note for their exceptionally low cross-sectional area, a drag-reducing feature which made them ideal for the many racing aircraft of that period. In 1934, the basic bronze-headed Gipsy Six, rated at 185 horsepower (138 kW) at 2,100 rpm was modified for use in the DH.88 Comet air racer as the Gipsy Six "R" which produced 223 horsepower (166 kW) at 2,400 rpm for takeoff. Many Gipsy Six engines remain in service powering vintage aircraft types today.

Design and development
The De Havilland Engine Company had hoped to produce a version of the basic engine capable of utilising a hydraulically actuated variable-pitch (VP) airscrew based on the American Hamilton "Bracket-Type" in time for the 1934 MacRobertson Race. Since there was so little time to perfect this installation, as a compromise, a French "Ratier" VP airscrew was fitted to the Comets' "R" engines, which utilised a simple air-filled bladder for a once-per-flight automatic pitch change. Later on, Comets were fitted with the Series II engine, which eliminated this crude system.

This was quickly followed by production of the  Gipsy Six Series II for use with the hydraulically actuated airscrews that de Havilland were by then producing under a licence acquired from Hamilton Standard in 1934. This was effectively the engine that the company did not have time to develop for the 1934 MacRobertson race, but without the significant increase in compression-ratio needed for the Comet - being 6:1 - compared to the Six-R's 6.5:1. The Series II unit, while superficially similar to its predecessor, utilised a hollow, splined crankshaft to permit the fitting of the VP airscrew utilising boosted pressurised oil from the engine's dry-sump lubrication system via a pilot-operated control valve. As well as differences to the crankcase and crankshaft, different cylinder barrels, pistons and aluminium cylinder heads were utilised. There was also an added, very limited ability provided on the Series II to run accessories. The "pilot-friendly" constant speed units (CSUs) were not available for these engines until 1939. The Series II was also equipped with AMC (Automatic Mixture Control) a barometric device, without which it was exceedingly difficult to adjust for a correct mixture with a CSU fitted. This feature was also carried over onto the similar Queen II. Pilots were then able to simply select the required RPM and Boost pressure required. This reduction in over-leaning also tended to extend the TBO (time between overhauls). The twin down-draught, Claudel-Hobson A.I.48 carburetters were common to all these engines. The induction system was designed to automatically obviate the effects of carburetter icing - a dangerous problem that still plagues most piston engines in current worldwide use in 2008, more than 70 years later.

Alfa Romeo built two engine types based on the Gipsy Six design, the Alfa Romeo 110 and Alfa Romeo 115.

Type history
The series of engines proved to be reliable, and the time between overhaul (TBO) was more than doubled within a few years. The Achilles' heel of the engine, its lack of facilities for running ancillary items, an increasing requirement during the 1930s, remained so. It was subsequently addressed on the similar Gypsy Queen III and Queen II engines developed for military applications.

While new designs, these still used all of the same basic configurations of the original Gipsy Six of the mid-1930s and were in use by operators such as the Royal Air Force (RAF) and Royal Navy (RN) until the 1980s.

Today, with de Havilland having long disappeared, very few of these engines remain in use and only a few specialist facilities can carry out overhauls.

Variants
Gipsy Six I
Bronze cylinder heads, 200hp. For fixed-pitch airscrews.
Gipsy Six Series II
Aluminium cylinder heads, designed for leaded fuel. 210 hp. For VP airscrews.
Gipsy Six 'R'
Racing engine with high lift camshaft. 220 hp. For VP airscrews.
Gipsy Queen
Military version of Gipsy Six;- Queen I;- 200hp. Small number produced. Similar to Queen II, but not provided with facility for a VP airscrew. Queen III;- 205 hp, Military version of the Six Series I, for fixed-pitch airscrews. Queen II;- The military version of the Gipsy Six Series II was the Queen II for VP airscrews, 210hp. Both the Queen II and the Queen III had strengthened crankcases. Later versions of the Queen III & Queen II had extra facilities for driving accessories. Later Queens from the Queen 30 onwards differed substantially, and whilst looking similar were in fact entirely new engines.
IAR 6-G1
Licence-built by Industria Aeronautică Română
Alfa Romeo 115
Alfa Romeo licence production/derivative

Applications

 ASJA Viking II
 Caproni Ca.308 Borea
 Cierva W.9
 de Havilland Dragon Six
 de Havilland Dragon Rapide
 de Havilland Express
 de Havilland DH.88
 IAR 27
 Koolhoven F.K.57
 Miles Mentor
 Parnall Heck
 Percival Mew Gull
 Percival Petrel
 Percival Vega Gull
 Rogožarski SIM-XII-H
 Tugan Gannet

Survivors
Gipsy Six engines remain in service worldwide as of April 2010. Twelve Gipsy Six-powered de Havilland Dragon Rapide aircraft are on the Civil Aviation Authority register although not all are currently airworthy.

Engines on display
A preserved Gipsy Six engine is on public display at the Shuttleworth Collection, Old Warden, Bedfordshire, another is on display at the Science Museum, London. The National Military Museum, Romania displays an engine cut open.

Specifications (Gipsy Six I)

See also

References

Notes

Bibliography

 Gunston, Bill. World Encyclopedia of Aero Engines. Wellingborough, UK: Patrick Stephens, 1986, p. 50. .
 Jane's Fighting Aircraft of World War II. London. Studio Editions Ltd, 1989.

External links

 Royal Air Force Museum Aero Engine Collection - Inline Engines

Air-cooled aircraft piston engines
Gipsy Six
1930s aircraft piston engines
Inverted aircraft piston engines
Straight-six engines